Tillery is an unincorporated community in Halifax County, North Carolina, that was a plantation and is now home to a museum. Tillery was incorporated as a town in 1889. Franklin Roosevelt's Resettlement Administration instituted a New Deal era resettlement program in the area. In 1936 it was renamed Roanoke Farms.  The ZIP Code for Tillery is 27887.

History
W. H. Randolph was its first mayor.

The Tillery Chapel Rosenwald Elementary School was a Rosenwald School established for the community. Tillery Chapel Elementary school also served the community until it closed in 1981. It became a community center.

The Hermitage is a historic plantation house in Tillery.

James M. Pittman served as Tillery's postmaster.

Roanoke River Correctional Institution, formerly Caledonia Correctional, is in Tillery.

Further reading
Tillery, North Carolina: One Hundred Years of Struggle in a Black Community by Cornelia Janke, History Honors Thesis, Duke University April, 1986

References

Unincorporated communities in Halifax County, North Carolina
1889 establishments in North Carolina